is a  mountain in Yahatahigashi-ku, Kitakyūshū, Fukuoka, Japan. This mountain is a part of Kitakyūshū Quasi-National Park.

Outline
Mount Sarakura is one of the major peaks of the Hobashira Mountains, and the most popular peak for visitors on the mountains. The Sarakurayama Cable Car and Sarakurayama Slope Car allow visitors to travel to the top from Yahata. A short walk from the slope car station are several buildings that house transmitters for TV and radio stations that serve Kitakyushu and the surrounding area.

There is an observation platform that is visited by tourists as it provides views of Kitakyushu's "10 Million Dollar Night View" (one of the New Three Major Night Views of Japan). (新日本三大夜景) in 2003.

Gallery

See also
Hobashira Cable

References

External links

Kitakyushu City official site (in English)
Mount Sarakura - Fukuoka Prefectute Sightseeing Information (in English)

Mountains of Fukuoka Prefecture
Kitakyushu
Tourist attractions in Kitakyushu